Multi-purpose is something that has more than one purpose and may more specifically refer to:

Buildings 
 Arena
 Auditorium
 Civic center
 Coliseum
 Convention center
 Facility
 Gymnasium, also called "Multi-Purpose Room" (MPR)
 Multi-purpose stadium
 Music venue
 Sports venue

Vehicles 
 Multi-Purpose Crew Vehicle, spacecraft
 Multi-purpose helicopter
 Multi-Purpose Logistics Module, Space Shuttle cargo container
 Multi-purpose vehicle, minivan
 Multi-purpose vessel, cargo ship/freighter

Other uses 
 Multi-Purpose Food
 Multi-purpose reef
 Multi-purpose tool
 Multi-Purpose Viewer, a software program

See also 
 
 
 Purpose (disambiguation)